Polysphalia is a monotypic moth genus in the family Geometridae. Its only species, Polysphalia cristigera, is found in New Guinea. Both the genus and species were first described by William Warren in 1906.

References

Moths described in 1915
Eupitheciini
Taxa named by William Warren (entomologist)
Monotypic moth genera